Mikhail Levin (born 10 April 1986) is a Russian male hammer thrower, who won an individual gold medal at the Youth World Championships.

References

External links

1986 births
Living people
Russian male hammer throwers